A Cotton bale is a standard-sized and weighted pack of compressed cotton lint after ginning. The dimensions and weight may vary with different cotton-producing countries.

Significance 
A bale has an essential role from the farm to the factory. The cotton yield is calculated in terms of the number of bales. Bale is a standard packaging method for cotton to avoid various hassles in handling, packing, and transportation. The bales also protect the lint from foreign contamination and make them readily identifiable.

Standards

Bale 
A "bale of cotton" is also the standard trading unit for cotton on the wholesale national and international markets. Although different cotton-growing countries have their bale standards, for example, In the United States, cotton is usually measured at approximately 0.48 cubic meters (17 cubic feet) and weighs 226.8 kilograms (500 pounds). In India, the standard bale size is 170 kg.

Parameters 
The most important parameters of a cotton bale are:

 Density (448 kg/m3)
 Measurements of the bales (nominally 1.40 m X 0.53 m X 0.69 m)
 Weight (Varies, but ‘statistical’ bale weighs 480 lb)

Advances in standardization are reducing the variation in weights, sizes, dimensions, and densities of cotton bales.

Candy 
Candy is another trading unit.  A candy weighs approximately 2.09 bales (356 kg). In India, ginned cotton is traded in terms of candy also which weighs 356 kg (355.62 kg).

Trash 
When cotton is harvested and exposed to ginning, it carries more than 64% cottonseed, 2% waste and 34% fibrous matter (also known as lint). Lower trash percentage in cotton increases the recovery. Cotton bales are not pure cotton; they contain foreign contaminants, residual trash and leaf (and other non lint material) that have a direct impact on the recovery in yarn spinning.

Gallery

Cotton cultivation

Harvesting

Ginning and bale making

See also 

 Cotton gin
 Cotton
 Spinning (textiles)
Wool bale

References 

Cotton
Cotton gin
Cotton production